The 2000–01 St. Francis Terriers men's basketball team represented St. Francis College during the 2000–01 NCAA Division I men's basketball season. The team was coached by Ron Ganulin, who was in his tenth year at the helm of the St. Francis Terriers. The Terriers' home games were played at the  Generoso Pope Athletic Complex. The team has been a member of the Northeast Conference since 1981.

The Terriers finished the season at 18–11 overall and 16–4 in conference play, to win their first Conference Regular Season Championship since being members of the NEC. The Terriers received a bye in the first round of the 2001 NEC Tournament and proceeded to defeat Wagner in the semifinals. The Terriers were just one game away from playing in their first NCAA Tournament before losing to Monmouth in the NEC Championship game 64–67, a game in which they led by 20 points with less than 14 minutes to play.

Roster

Schedule and results

|-
!colspan=12 style="background:#0038A8; border: 2px solid #CE1126;;color:#FFFFFF;"| Regular season

|-
!colspan=12 style="background:#0038A8; border: 2px solid #CE1126;;color:#FFFFFF;"| 2001 NEC tournament

References

St. Francis Brooklyn Terriers men's basketball seasons
St. Francis
St. Francis Terriers men's b
St. Francis Terriers men's b